Deja Vu II: Lost in Las Vegas is a point-and-click adventure game, the sequel to Deja Vu: A Nightmare Comes True, set in the world of 1940s hardboiled detective novels and movies. It was the last game made in the MacVenture series.

An NES version was advertised in an issue of Nintendo Power, but the game was cancelled mid-development, possibly due to the game being released after the NES's lifespan. However, the game was released for the Game Boy Color as part of Deja Vu I & II: The Casebooks of Ace Harding. Like its predecessor, elements were censored, such as replacing the game over screen depicting the Grim Reaper with a gun with a gravestone. However, some scenes, including the ending, were expanded upon with more detail.

Gameplay

In this follow-up, set in the late 1940s, hard-boiled hero Theodore "Ace" Harding is kidnapped in the middle of the night and knocked unconscious. He awakens, this time in a bathroom at the Las Vegas Lucky Dice Hotel and Casino. However, this time he is relieved that his memory is intact. It soon becomes apparent that the Vegas mobster Tony Malone is missing a hundred grand ($112,000 to be exact) after the events that took place in Deja Vu (I): a Nightmare Comes True and that Ace has become the scapegoat due to being the last man Joey Siegel talked to prior to his death; Ace is to return the money within a week or face the classic "or else"; in other words, his death.

Deja Vu II takes place in a sparsely populated Las Vegas reminiscent of the movie Bugsy, with just a few locations to explore. However, the player has the option to take the train to other cities including Chicago (if the player attempts to go to Los Angeles, St. Louis, or New York prematurely, Ace is killed by Malone's personal executioner, Stogie Martin), where locations from Deja Vu I are revisited. Connections to this background story are well explained, and the game is completely playable by itself. In fact, there are situations where experience with Deja Vu I can be a disadvantage by creating certain expectations, for instance: the phone in the office at Joe's Bar is  openable in Deja Vu I, while in Deja Vu II, it contains an important item. To get to the office, the player has to climb the fire ladder from the street, which is "too high" to reach in Deja Vu I.

There is also a police presence in Deja Vu II, though they are not after Ace directly as in the first game. Here, Ace can be arrested immediately following the player doing some unlawful act in a public location. Examples of offenses are disturbing the peace (by breaking glass or firing a gun), indecent exposure (not wearing any clothes), assault (hitting an innocent person), impersonating a peace officer (if found wearing the police uniform at random public places where it is not required to advance), or murder (shooting or stabbing an innocent person). An arrest causes the game to be lost as  Ace is put on the electric chair (for murder). For any other arrest, it is said that Ace languishes in jail until the end of the week when Stogie appears to post bail, then promises to take Ace "somewhere nice and quiet", where he executes Ace in either the Las Vegas desert or Chicago cemetery (in the GBC version, neither is stated, though Stogie kills the player with his double barreled shotgun). The player can also go to the Chicago police station from the first game, however it is implied they are being bribed to look the other way once you do. If a player goes to said police station the game states they don't care for your story then they detain Ace and the aforementioned Stogie death will go on as being arrested.

Like the other MacVenture games there is a time limit, in this case the hitman Stogie, who periodically reminds Ace to "come up with the dough". If the player takes too long, Stogie will gun down Ace. Although no longer affected by drug-induced amnesia (as in Deja Vu I), the player still experiences memory flashbacks when encountering certain environments or photographs, or examining certain objects.

Together with its predecessor, Deja Vu II is considered by some fans to be the most difficult of these games and requires a lot of lateral thinking. As the player has no hope of actually physically finding the lost money, the ultimate goal is to find some way out of the predicament with the correct evidence. The player will learn what happened to the money by comparing two like ledgers, which reveal it was spent on police bribes in an effort to sway the loyalty of corrupt cops from Malone to Ventini. As in Deja Vu I, the gameplay has a final part where evidence collected during the game has to be planted in the right places. This part is among the trickiest in the game, since the significance of each tidbit can be hard to assess. The player must leave sufficient evidence of Daniel Ventini's treachery in Tony Malone's office and leave proper evidence of Tony Malone's "awareness" in Daniel Ventini's secret office, then he must leave Las Vegas to avoid being caught in the ensuing gang war.

Reception
Computer Gaming World, reviewing the Macintosh version, gave the game a negative review, saying, "Linear text games with "Guess The Commands" are right down on the bottom of my list of boring ways to waste time." An example pointed out in the review is that the command "operate - flashlight" wields the flashlight as a weapon, while "Flashlight - operate - flashlight" is needed to turn it on. Compute! was more positive, stating that Deja Vu had "a quality plot and a clever interface". Macworld reviewed the Macintosh version of Deja Vu II: Lost in Las Vegas, praising its standalone story to its predecessor, and state that Deja Vu II is not the perfect interactive game, but it is a superior effort. By keeping your wits about you, and not consulting the hint book too often, you should enjoy hours of solid fun and adventure". Macworld expresses that in some instances puzzles defy "ordinary logic, making the purchase of the $5 hint book virtually mandatory", and also criticizes the presence of copy protection.

See also
Deja Vu: a Nightmare Comes True

References

External links
Information and download for Mac version
Information and download for Apple IIGS version 
Deja Vu I & II: The Casebooks of Ace Harding at GameRankings
Deja Vu I & II: The Casebooks of Ace Harding Review at Adventure Gamers
Deja Vu I & II: The Casebooks of Ace Harding Review at Game Informer
Deja Vu I & II: The Casebooks of Ace Harding Review at IGN

1988 video games
Adventure games
Amiga games
Apple IIGS games
Atari ST games
Cancelled Nintendo Entertainment System games
CD-i games
Detective video games
DOS games
First-person adventure games
Game Boy Color games
ICOM Simulations games
Classic Mac OS games
Organized crime video games
Point-and-click adventure games
Video game sequels
Video games developed in the United States
Video games set in the Las Vegas Valley
Video games set in Chicago
Video games set in the 1940s
Mindscape games